The 1872 United States presidential election in Kentucky took place on November 5, 1872, as part of the 1872 United States presidential election. Voters chose 12 representatives, or electors to the Electoral College, who voted for president and vice president.

Kentucky voted for the Liberal Republican candidate, Horace Greeley, over Republican candidate, Ulysses S. Grant. Greeley won Kentucky by a margin of 5.88%. However, Greeley died prior to the Electoral College meeting, meaning for Kentucky's 12 electors could vote for the candidate of their choice: eight voted for Indiana Senator Thomas Hendricks, while four voted for Greeley's running mate, Benjamin Gratz Brown.

Results

Footnotes

References

Kentucky
1872
1872 Kentucky elections